Mildred Natwick (June 19, 1905 – October 25, 1994) was an American actress. She won a Primetime Emmy Award and was nominated for an Academy Award and two Tony Awards.

Early life 
Natwick was born in Baltimore, Maryland, the daughter of Mildred Marion (née Dawes) and Joseph Natwick. Her father was the owner of Dunloggin Dairy Farm. Her grandfather, Ole Natwick, was one of the earliest Norwegian immigrants to the United States, arriving in Wisconsin in 1847. Her first cousin was animator and cartoonist Grim Natwick. Natwick attended the Bryn Mawr School in Baltimore and later graduated from Bennett College.

Career
Natwick began performing on the stage at age 21 with "The Vagabonds", a non-professional theatre group in Baltimore. She soon joined the University Players on Cape Cod. Natwick made her Broadway debut in 1932 playing Mrs. Noble in Frank McGrath’s play Carry Nation, about the famous temperance crusader Carrie Nation. Throughout the 1930s she starred in a number of plays, frequently collaborating with friend and actor-director-playwright Joshua Logan. On Broadway, she played "Prossy" in Katharine Cornell's production of Candida. She made her film debut in John Ford's The Long Voyage Home as a Cockney slattern, and portrayed the landlady in The Enchanted Cottage (1945).

Natwick is remembered for small but memorable roles in several John Ford film classics, including 3 Godfathers (1948), She Wore a Yellow Ribbon (1949), and The Quiet Man (1952). She played Miss Ivy Gravely, in Alfred Hitchcock's The Trouble with Harry (1955), and a sorceress in The Court Jester (1956).

   
She continued to appear onstage, and made regular guest appearances in television series. On May 30, 1950, she starred in "Listen, Listen" on Suspense.

She was twice nominated for Tony Awards: in 1957 for The Waltz of the Toreadors, the same year she also starred in Tammy and the Bachelor with Debbie Reynolds and Leslie Nielsen  and in 1972 for the musical 70 Girls 70. She returned to film in Barefoot in the Park (1967) as the mother of the character played by Jane Fonda. The role earned Natwick her only Academy Award nomination for Best Supporting actress. One of Natwick's memorable roles was in The House Without a Christmas Tree (1972), which starred Jason Robards and Lisa Lucas. The program's success spawned three sequels: The Thanksgiving Treasure, The Easter Promise, and Addie and The King of Hearts.

In 1971, Natwick co-starred with Helen Hayes in the ABC Movie of the Week, Do Not Fold, Spindle, or Mutilate, in which their characters worked together as amateur sleuths. The success of that telefilm resulted in a similar team-up the next year, portraying two mystery-writing and solving sisters; this spawned the 1973-74 series The Snoop Sisters, which was part of The NBC Wednesday Mystery Movie. For her performance, Natwick won the Primetime Emmy Award for Outstanding Lead Actress in a Miniseries or a Movie. In 1981, Natwick joined Hayes as the first members of the Board of Advisors to the Riverside Shakespeare Company. Both attended and supported several fund raisers for that off-Broadway theatre company.

She guest-starred on such television series as McMillan & Wife, Family, Alice, The Love Boat, Hawaii Five-O, The Bob Newhart Show and Murder, She Wrote. She made her final film appearance at age 83 in the historical drama Dangerous Liaisons (1988).

Personal life and death
Natwick, who never married or had children, lived in a duplex on Park Avenue in Manhattan for the majority of her life. She was a devout Christian Scientist. A Republican, she supported Dwight Eisenhower during the 1952 presidential election.

On October 25, 1994, Natwick died of cancer at her home in Manhattan at age 89. She is interred at Lorraine Park Cemetery in Baltimore.

Broadway credits

Filmography

Partial television credits

References

External links

 
 
 
 
 Mildred Natwick papers, 1932-1985, held by the Billy Rose Theatre Division, New York Public Library for the Performing Arts

1905 births
1994 deaths
20th-century American actresses
20th-century American singers
20th-century American women singers
Actresses from Baltimore
American Christian Scientists
American film actresses
American people of Norwegian descent
American musical theatre actresses
American stage actresses
American television actresses
Bennett College (New York) alumni
Bryn Mawr School people
California Republicans
Burials in Maryland
Deaths from cancer in New York (state)
Outstanding Performance by a Lead Actress in a Miniseries or Movie Primetime Emmy Award winners
Western (genre) film actresses
Maryland Republicans
New York (state) Republicans